Anna Tatarinova is a Belarusian football midfielder currently playing in the Ukrainian League for Zhytlobud Kharkiv, with which she has also played the Champions League. In 1999 she made her debut for the Belarusian national team, and two years later she played the inaugural edition of the European Cup for FC Bobruichanka.

References

1978 births
Living people
Belarusian women's footballers
Expatriate women's footballers in Ukraine
Belarusian expatriate sportspeople in Ukraine
WFC Zhytlobud-1 Kharkiv players
Women's association football midfielders
Belarus women's international footballers
Bobruichanka Bobruisk players